Threnody is a fictional character appearing in American comic books published by Marvel Comics. The character has appeared in the X-Men series.

Fictional character biography

Melody Jacobs was born in Manhattan, New York City. She led a relatively normal life until her mutant powers manifested in adolescence. She found herself feeding off of the energies released by the dead and the dying, energies so dark and primal she found herself lost in them. Some of the residual slivers of the dead's souls lingered in her mind as she absorbed this energy, leaving her psyche in a state of chaos. Melody became a runaway, living on the streets alone for a week before she was found by Emil Blonsky, the gamma-mutated Abomination. The Abomination had established himself as the lord of a clan of homeless and runaways known as the Forgotten, who took refuge in the sewers under the city. Melody spent weeks lying in a fugue-like state in Blonsky's Last Lair, cared for by the sewer dwellers he championed. One older couple looked after Melody most of the time and called her "Threnody" after the mournful cries she made in-between her brief periods of lucidity.

A second stage of Threnody's mutation occurred; she had built up massive power which was violently released as a "death-purge" which instantly killed her kindly caretakers. Horrified by what she had done and rejected by the Abomination, Threnody fled to the West Coast and lived on the streets of Los Angeles. She was in constant agony and often delusional. She met Gordon Lefferts, a geneticist occasionally in the employ of Mister Sinister who was the first mutant exposed to the Legacy Virus. Lefferts identified the virus within him and began studying it for a possible cause and cure. Threnody and a number of other homeless were squatting in the private lab space where Lefferts worked; he may have performed some experiments on them while they stayed with him. Whether it was because of this or something else, Threnody's powers were altered, and she became uniquely sensitive to the Legacy Virus. She could feel mutants around the world, empathically accumulating a death charge from each one that was infected with the virus.

Threnody was present at Lefferts' lab when both Mister Sinister and the X-Men came searching for the geneticist's work on the virus. Sinister was intrigued by Threnody, seeing her as a potential bloodhound to hunt for infected mutants for him in his efforts to stop the spread of the virus. He offered to try to help Melody, suggesting that at the very least her powers could help locate those in need of assistance due to the virus. Threnody tentatively agreed. Beast and Rogue were reluctant to allow Threnody to go with Sinister instead of returning with them to the X-Mansion, but Beast 
realized that Sinister might be better equipped to fight the virus, as Sinister had no conscience to restrict him in his search for a cure.

Threnody quickly improved under Sinister's care. His treatments stabilized her mind and restored her lucidity, although the death cries of others still rang in her ears. Sinister also crafted a solution to her death-purge ability: small neuro-locks that adhered to her brow and prevented her stored plasma energy from being releasing unintentionally. In return, Threnody acted as a living data processor in tandem with Sinister's remote viewing equipment. Within one of his primary tesseract labs, Threnody was connected to Sinister's systems which directed her empathic powers to locate and track mutants around the world who were afflicted with the Legacy Virus. She also monitored other data his equipment was collecting and catalogued this information for his use. Threnody used this opportunity for self-improvement, assimilating vast amounts of knowledge and learning. When the Beast and the X-Men infiltrated Sinister's lab, Threnody aided them in sabotaging his stores of genetic samples and shared what she had learned about his machinations. Despite the Beast's offer to leave with them, Threnody decided to remain as Sinister's servant, feeling she could do more good from within and continue to learn from his databases.

Over time, Threnody learned a great deal more and began plotting how to get out from under Sinister's thumb. Her constant monitoring led to her discovery of Nate Grey (X-Man), fresh from the Age of Apocalypse, and she saw in him a chance to free herself from Sinister. She concealed Nate's arrival from Sinister and eventually fled to Paris to seek him. Almost immediately, Sinister unleashed the Marauders to find and return her to him. Luckily for Threnody, Nate heard her psychic cries for help and was more than willing to stand against Sinister's forces on any world. Grey fought off the Marauders on Threnody's behalf and killed nearly all of them. He implanted a false memory of Threnody's death in the mind of Riptide, the sole surviving Marauder, in the hope that Sinister would abandon his search for her.

Threnody asked if she could accompany X-Man's search for the mysterious Madelyne Pryor; they became traveling companions. Their search led them to the area of Switzerland where Nate first crash-materialized in our universe. There they encountered Cable and Exodus and the conflict that followed was chaotic, thanks to the vast psionic energies unleashed by the three. Following the battle, Threnody and Nate were taken to Red Cross emergency center set up to help those displaced and injured by the superhuman battle that had devastated the region. Nate woke to Threnody's kiss and began to question his initial trust in her. He dove into her psyche to find out if Sinister was using her to get at him, consciously or otherwise. While Sinister's presence was indeed quite strong in her mind, Nate did not detect any signs of deceit in Threnody. Nate went too far when he interfered with the neuro-locks on her brow, releasing Threnody's death-charge in a massive explosion that would've destroyed the lodge if he hadn't telekinetically controlled the blast. The two of them were thrown clear by the explosion and when she awoke, Threnody considered abandoning Nate as more trouble than he was worth. After further reflection, Threnody realized she may have found a kindred spirit in X-Man and tended to him as he recovered from exhausting his psionic energies.

Following this, Threnody and Nate traveled to Greece for some rest and recuperation. Their vacation was interrupted by Holocaust who had been drafted into the service of Onslaught and sent after Nate. Holocaust killed and maimed a number of civilians caught in the firefight, setting off Threnody's empathic senses. She tried to get the innocents to safety while Nate engaged Apocalypse's butcher son, but being in such close proximity with the dying for the first time revealed new aspects of Threnody's power. She discovered that when someone was this close to death, she could deliberately prod them the rest of the way and absorb their full death agonies. Worse, she discovered she liked it. The man she killed was already crushed under some rubble and on the brink of death. Threnody rationalized to herself that she was ending his suffering, but still... she liked it.

Together, Nate and Threnody managed to drive off Holocaust and help many of those injured when he attacked. Afterward, Threnody suggested Nate seek help against the threat of Onslaught. Since Nate had bad encounters with the X-Men in the past, she suggested that the Avengers would make a good second choice. Once they arrived in New York, however, Threnody split without even saying good-bye. It is not exactly clear why she did this. Perhaps she was uncomfortable with how her feelings for Nate had grown in such a short time or realized there was some truth to Nate's theory that Sinister was using her to get at him. Whatever the reason, she soon found herself back in hot water, tracked down and captured by Mister Sinister and his Marauders. Sinister also captured Nate having gained access to his mind the moment he psychically hacked into the neuro-locks Sinister designed for Threnody. His time with Sinister was brief though as he was soon snatched away by Onslaught. Meanwhile, Threnody managed to escape from Arclight and Scalphunter who were holding her in the tunnels under Manhattan. They quickly caught up with her but she was saved by the Abomination, who found her again just as he had years earlier.

Threnody's reunion with the Forgotten proved bittersweet. The Abomination blamed Threnody for the deaths she caused when her powers flared up during her prior stay at his lair. Nate tracked her down and battled the Abomination who revealed Threnody's deadly acts in the past. Nate experienced Blonsky's memories of the incident and Threnody admitted that she killed the couple caring for her but explained that it was an accident. Nate now knew about her past and accepted her in spite of it all. This proved a turning point in their relationship. They left the tunnels and Threnody finally put her past with the Forgotten behind her.

In the aftermath of the Onslaught, Threnody and Nate tried to create a new life for themselves. They began to play house, squatting in a hard-to-rent SoHo loft. Nate developed a following as a street psychic in Washington Square Park, earning them some spending money. Life was good for a few weeks and their friendship soon blossomed into something much more. They each struggled with the morality of their mutant powers and the temptation to use them for their own satisfaction and gain. Despite their growing love for and dependence on each other, the specter of Sinister hung over their relationship like a cloud. No matter how deep his psi-probes went, Nate was unable to shake the suspicion that Mister Sinister was still using Threnody against him somehow. He now knew that she wasn't consciously betraying him to Sinister but wondered if they were both pawns in Sinister's latest plan to play with the Summers family genetics. Threnody's powers continued to cause trouble as well. She became more and more addicted to the death charge released by others and began actively feeding off of those near death. Her rationalizations became weaker as her needs grew stronger. She argued that a stroll through a terminal cancer ward was an act of mercy as she only sped them toward their inevitable end. But she soon began feeding off of the addicts and homeless living on the streets as well. What's more, her body was changing and she no longer needed food or sustenance, surviving solely on the death energy she craved. Eventually, Nate pushed her away and Threnody did what she always did when things got tough: she ran away.

Threnody returned to life on the streets and her depression led her to feed off the homeless with greater abandon. While searching for answers at her mother's graveside, Threnody was visited by Morbius the Living Vampire. Having just fed off of Nate, Morbius learned of Threnody's cravings. He sensed a kindred spirit and reached out to her. For the first time in her life, Threnody had found someone who understood the hunger and temptation she had to live with every day. Threnody felt an instant attraction to the darkness within Morbius. However, Nate and Spider-Man arrived and tried to drive off the vampire but Threnody helped to defend him. After Morbius fled, Nate finally confronted Threnody about how she preyed on the dying. He condemned her for it, gently but firmly, and told her to return home only when she wanted his help in fighting her addiction.

Threnody didn't get the chance to make up her mind. The unstable Madelyne Pryor arrived at the graveyard in search of Nate Grey. Threnody knew Madelyne from Nate's talk of her but also from Sinister's files and knew she was programmed to breed with the Summers line. Lashing out with jealously and contempt, Threnody reveals to Maddie that despite walking around she was in fact still dead. Enraged, Madelyne attacked Threnody and unleashed the neuro-locks restraining Threnody's power, sucking her dry of her energy.

Threnody was left for dead in St. Raymond's Cemetery and was picked up as a Jane Doe and taken to the morgue. Her power would not let her die; Threnody fed off of her own death charge before consuming the energies within the morgue. This restored her to a semblance of life and she walked away from the morgue. However her power had developed a second mutation, causing the dead to rise and follow her. Threnody's very presence now influenced the death energy in her environment, bringing nearby corpses back as undead "zomboids" who followed her wherever she went. Seeking to feed, Threnody stumbled into the Last Lair after the psychotic Jackknife massacred the entire gang and drank deep off of the lingering death energies there. She remained in the Morlock Tunnels until she discovered the Dark Beast's labs nearby. Threnody wisely chose to relocate before he discovered her presence.

She and her loyal, benign undead entourage haunted the SoHo loft apartment where she and Nate Grey had lived until Nate unexpectedly dropped in again after several months away. Threnody kept to the shadows and was angered to see Nate was travelling with Madelyne Pryor, the woman who killed her. Her powers were not all that had changed since she rose from the dead. Threnody's stomach was now noticeably distended making it appear as if she was several months pregnant. She tracked Nate via his unique death energy for a time, first to Alaska and then to Seattle where he collapsed in an alley after a battle. She took him to her refuge under the Seattle piers. While he lay unconscious for a week, she was sustained by her zomboids who had grown addicted to Threnody. Nate woke to see the zomboids hungrily clawing at Threnody, who seemed to be in a delusional state or intense pain. When Nate pulled her free, she was as svelte and slim as the day they met. All signs of her apparent pregnancy were gone.

Threnody's tolerance for the ever-present zomboids that followed her around had turned to fear and she hoped that reconnecting with Nate would help her rid herself of them. She managed to escape the zomboids for a while with Nate's telekinetic help and the former couple finally had a chance to catch up. Threnody told Nate that she never "abandoned" him all those months ago as he believed and told him how she had been killed by Madelyne. She also confessed to Nate about her feedings at the cancer ward and among the homeless. Both Threnody and Nate finally acknowledged that she was addicted to death.

The zomboids soon located their unwitting mistress and Threnody and Nate fled to an anchored yacht far from the zomboids and anyone near death that Threnody could feed off. Nate hoped that this would allow her to beat her addiction "cold turkey". Her withdrawal was a difficult one, particularly because of Nate's own unique death energy. Because his power was killing him and would cut his life short before he reached 21, Nate Grey was a constant source of ripe death energy for Threnody. She had been feeding on Nate's death energies since they met. In her newly enhanced state, Threnody was actively weakening Nate every minute they were together. He provided an everlasting high for her death addiction. For both their sakes, Threnody insisted on cutting ties with Nate and going her own way. When he told her he loved her and would stay by her regardless, Threnody pushed Nate away by claiming that she never loved him, only the "taste" of his death energies. To save the man she loved, Threnody broke his heart, leaving a shattered Nate Grey behind as she disappeared once more into the night.

After parting ways with Nate this final time, Threnody retrieved a bundle from her refuge which appeared to be a newborn child. The secrets of this child and its parentage along with the true nature of Threnody's pregnancy have not yet been revealed.

Threnody has not been seen following M-Day but rumors have spread that she is still active but has yet to reveal herself as well as the full details of Threnody's post-mortem condition have yet to be fully explained. Threnody along with the Harkspur Brood and Blackout, were later revealed to be promising recruits to the Assassins Guild, and were requested by Belladona Boudreaux, the Leader of the Assassins Guild, to deal with Deadpool, however Deadpool easily kills the Harkspur Brood and Threnody eventually betrays Blackout and prevented him from killing Deadpool, revealing in the process that she had been under Blackout's care for an uncertain time and for that same reason she let him live. Threnody then asked Deadpool if she could tag along in him which she used to feed off all the death that surrounds him. After Weasel was killed by Assassins Guild mercenaries, Threnody kidnapped Clarice and reveals that she only joined with the Assassins Guild and later with Deadpool so she could collect the death energy she needed to feed her newborn child, and while at first it appeared to be working, she would discover that the energy wasn't nearly enough as the child was still hungry. As it turns out the child had been affected by Thenody's powers, resulting in the baby born already an undead demonic creature which required to be regularly nourished with the necroplasmic energies Threnody was capable of absorbing. Now she hoped to absorb Clarice's unborn baby's energy to cure her baby's affliction. Deadpool eventually tracked down Threnody and tried to make her come to her senses to no avail, so he impaled Threnody's baby to stop her. Threnody initially retaliated against Deadpool until he made Melody realize he wanted to spare her from the guilt of murdering a child. She then left him with the warning to stay away from her.

Powers and abilities
Threnody has a unique link to death, as is hinted at with her name. She is capable of sensing the certain necroplasmic energies that surround a person when they are near death or dying. She then absorbs this energy and uses it to generate concussive blasts of energy. When Threnody was murdered, she fed off her own death energy, which resurrected her. This experience of being so close to death enhanced her powers, allowing Threnody to now also be able to bring back the dead as mindless zombies who follow her every command. The zombies that Threnody creates are completely loyal to her and appear to have super strength and can still fight for their "queen" even when their limbs are torn from their bodies. Threnody has often been depicted as being enraptured by the scent of death and the "taste" of the energy, sometimes to the point of it being an addiction. Because of this, Threnody's powers have caused much sadness in her life.

References

External links
Threnody at World of Black Heroes
Profile of Threnody at UncannyXmen.net 
Marveldatabase:Character Gallery Threnody

Marvel Comics female supervillains
Fictional African-American people
Marvel Comics mutants
Fictional empaths
Characters created by Fabian Nicieza
Comics characters introduced in 1993